Since the 1976 Summer Olympics in Montreal, the Royal Canadian Mint has struck Summer and Winter Olympic coins to mark Games held in Canada.

1976 Montreal Summer Games

Most numismatists agree that the first true numismatic collection was the Olympic Five and Ten Dollar coins for the 1976 Montreal Olympics. Starting in February 1973, the Royal Canadian Mint (RCM) engaged in a very ambitious program. At the behest of the federal government, led by then-Prime Minister Pierre Elliott Trudeau, it was agreed that these coins would help finance and commemorate the 1976 Summer Olympics.

The plan was to have thirty coins, twenty-eight silver coins with face values of $5 and $10, and two gold coins. This would signify the first time that the RCM issued coins with face values of $5 and $10 since 1914. These coins would be categorized into seven series with each series configured into four coin sets (two five dollar coins and two ten dollar coins). The seven series were constituted as follows:

 Geographic
 Olympic Motifs
 Early Canadian Sports
 Olympic Track and Field Sports
 Olympic Water Sports
 Olympic Team and Body Contact Sports
 Olympic Souvenirs

The $10 denomination coins have a gross weight of 48.600 grams while the $5 denomination coins have a gross weight of 24.300 grams. Each coin is 92.5% silver for a net silver weight of 44.955 grams (1.4453 troy ounces) and 22.478 grams (0.7227 troy ounces) of silver respectively.

A key highlight of these coins were the standardized designs and the unique finishes. All 28 coins were styled in a similar fashion. The top aspect of the coin had the Olympic logo, its denomination, and the wording in the same spot. The finishes consisted of two different styles that had never been used on Canadian coinage. The first finish was a satin or frosted effect which adorned the coin. The second finish was a proof finish, which consisted of frosted lettering and a design set off against a brilliant mirror field. The RCM had to obtain special equipment to achieve the desired finish.

A very limited number of the $5 and $10 coins were initially sold by the bank in styrofoam packing and the coins were NOT encapsulated. The coins could be purchased loose, and individually

1976 Montreal Olympic Coins
Series 1

Series 2

Series 3

Series 4

Series 5

Series 6

Series 7

100 Dollar Gold

1988 Calgary Winter Games

Heading into the 1980s, the Olympics would return to Canada. The city of Calgary would host the 1988 Winter Olympics. Starting in 1985, the Federal Government, under the leadership of then-Prime Minister Brian Mulroney, issued a ten coin set to help finance and commemorate the Olympic games. In similar style to the Montreal Olympics, the RCM would introduce coins with a face value that had never been used before. Said coins would feature a $20 face value. These coins were issued in Proof quality only, and were sold with the partnership of the Royal Bank of Canada. Unlike the Montreal coins, mintage was limited to 5,000,000 coins and this would mark the first time that any silver coin had edge lettering on it. Said lettering was 'XV OLYMPIC WINTER GAMES - JEUX D'OLYMPIQUES D'HIVER.'  There are existing varieties that have missed the edge lettering process. The 10 coins were also available in a green felt case with an Olympic logo on the outside and a Royal Canadian Mint medallion on the inside. The cost was $370. The medallion could be removed and the gold coin, offered separately, could be placed into its place. The numbered and signed Certificate of Authenticity was included in the cases internal cover recess. The entire case was fit into a white cardboard sleeve with the Olympic logo on the outside.

1988 Calgary Olympic Coins

One Hundred Dollar Gold

Olympic Centennial

The International Olympic Committee decided to commemorate the Centennial of the Olympic Games by issuing a coin set. This was a collaborative effort with five Mints contributing coins. The first three coins were issued by the RCM in 1992. The other Mints included Austria, Australia, France, and Greece.

Two of the coins were silver with a face value of $15 while the third coin was gold and had a face value of $175. The $15 coins were sold individually or in a set. The individual coins were packaged in a burgundy leatherette case while the set was featured in a wooden display case. Both $15 coins featured lettering on its edge: CITIUS, ALTIUS, FORTIUS. The $175 coin featured a Certificate of Authenticity signed by Juan Antonio Samaranch. The lettering on its edge was the same as the lettering found on the silver coins.  There are a few very rare examples of these coins with a plain edge (no edge lettering).  These plain edge coins were once held by the investment firm responsible for the $50 million Ohio Coingate Scandal.

100th anniversary coins

2004-2016 Olympics

Circulation coins

Lucky Loonie

For the first time, the 2010 Olympic Lucky Loonie does not have a loon on it, instead has the 2010 Vancouver winter Olympic symbol ilanaaq, an inukshuk.

First Strikes

Numismatic coins

2010 Vancouver Olympics

Circulation Coins
The Vancouver 2010 Olympic Circulation Coin Program consists of 17 coins: 15 quarters and 2 Loonies. The D.G. Regina inscription will be removed from the Queen's effigy, making the 25-cent coins one of the few "godless circulating coins", a rare event in Canadian coinage. The first circulating $1 coin will be dated 2008 but the obverse will be the standard effigy of Queen Elizabeth II by Susanna Blunt with the wording "ELIZABETH II" and "D.G. REGINA" with the Circle M privy mark.

2007 Five different Olympic commemoratives were minted for circulation.

All of these coins were also made available at service stations, encapsulated on a credit card-sized card. Many pressings of the Alpine Skiing coin released to service stations and to special 2010 Winter Olympic "coin boards" in October 2007 were the victim of a pressing error called a mule, with a 2008 obverse accidentally minted rather than the expected 2007. According to the Royal Canadian Mint, "sports cards" and 10,000 "coin board" sets were released with the error before it was caught.[note: the 2007 Alpine Skiing colour quarters were later struck with the correct 2007 die]. A similar mule occurred with the Wheelchair Curling issue, with an obverse featuring the standard Vancouver 2010 logo being used instead of the Paralympic logo. Both coins subsequently found demand in the collectors market. 2009 bobsleigh mules have also been found in circulation and colourized carded coins.
 
2008 Three different Olympic commemoratives were minted for circulation.

2009 Five different Olympic commemoratives are planned for circulation. The proposed medalist coins are now the Olympic moments coins, and three million of each moments coins will have red colouring.

2010 Two different Olympic commemoratives are planned for circulation.

Twenty-Five Cents

First Strikes

Special Edition Coin rolls
 As these rolls were sold directly from the Royal Canadian Mint in a special red paper wrapping.

Special edition uncirculated coin sets

Numismatic coins

Special Edition Proof Dollars

Twenty-Five Dollars

Specifications

Seventy-Five Dollars

Specifications

Two Hundred and Fifty Dollars

Specifications

Three Hundred Dollars

Specifications

Two Thousand Five Hundred Dollars

Specifications

Bullion Coins
The Royal Canadian Mint and the International Olympic Committee have reached an agreement on Olympic Gold and Silver Maple Leaf coins. The announcement was made on August 3, 2007 and the agreement allows the RCM to strike bullion coins with the emblems of the 2010 Olympic and Paralympic Games. The issue will consist of two coins: one Gold Maple Leaf coin and a Canadian Silver Maple Leaf coin and both coins will feature the date of 2008. The new agreement means that the RCM is now selling Olympic coins through all of its major business lines: bullion, circulation, numismatics.

2010 Winter Paralympics
Two commemorative circulation coins for the 2010 Winter Paralympics were issued. They are listed on the above chart but are also listed separately for easier reference.

Specifications

Details

Both 2010 Winter Games

Mascot Coins
Each Mascot coin features each of the Vancouver 2010 Olympic and Paralympic mascots: Miga, Quatchi and Sumi. But no coin features Mukmuk, a "sidekick" of these mascots.

Mascot Sport Poses
Each Mascot sport pose coin features either or both Miga and Quatchi and single Sumi. But no coin features Mukmuk, a "sidekick" of these mascots. All coins had a face value of 50 cents, were packaged in a plastic sleeve, and the issue price was $9.95.

See also
Modern Olympic coins
Modern Olympic Coins (2000-present)
Modern Winter Olympic coins

References

External links
 Royal Canadian Mint Act
 Royal Canadian Numismatic Association

Olympic
Canadian coins
Canadian coins
Canadian coins
Canadian coins
Ice hockey collectibles
Canadian

fr:Monnaie royale canadienne